The fictional character Frank Castle / Punisher, a comic book vigilante antihero created by Gerry Conway, John Romita Sr. and Ross Andru and featured in Marvel Comics publications, has appeared as a main character in multiple theatrical and straight-to-video films, many of them unrelated to each other. The first live-action film in 1989, was released theatrically worldwide then straight-to-video in the United States, starring Dolph Lundgren, while the second film was released in theaters in 2004, starring Thomas Jane. After an unsuccessful script of Punisher 2, the film series was then rebooted again in 2008 with the film Punisher: War Zone, starring Ray Stevenson.

Besides the three live-action films, the character was also the subject of three fan films and has appeared in several animated films.

Development
The first film, known simply as The Punisher and starring Dolph Lundgren, is a film that was released theatrically internationally but straight to video in North America by Live Entertainment in 1989 that is most notable for lacking the character's signature skull. Marvel hired Jonathan Hensleigh to write and direct the 2004 film, starring Thomas Jane. The film was mainly based on two Punisher comic book stories; The Punisher: Year One and Welcome Back, Frank.

A direct sequel was supposed to follow based on strong DVD sales, but the lack of a good script kept the project in development for over 3 years, and by the end both Jonathan Hensleigh and Thomas Jane pulled out. In June 2007, Lexi Alexander was hired to direct and Ray Stevenson was hired in July to play the Punisher in the newly titled Punisher: War Zone, which became a reboot, and not a sequel to 2004's The Punisher. This is the second time the film series has been rebooted, after the 2004 production rebooted 1989's The Punisher. The film was released on December 5, 2008. The films primarily focus on Frank's vigilante crusade after the death of his family.

Live-action

The Punisher (1989)

He is the city's most wanted, and most mysterious, vigilante. He has killed 125 people in the last 5 years. He is The Punisher (Dolph Lundgren), a one-man weapon against crime. In reality the Punisher is Frank Castle, an ex-cop whose family was murdered by mobsters. Now legally declared dead, he strikes back from beyond the grave, killing mobsters wherever he can find them. As a result of this, the mobsters' families have weakened, forcing Gianni Franco, the leader of one of the families, to come in and take control of the families. Franco has a plan to bring the families together as one unit.

However, this has attracted the attention of Lady Tanaka (Kim Miyori) and the Yakuza, Asia's most powerful crime syndicate, who decide to take over the families and all their interests. To sway the mobsters to their cause, they kidnap their children. Now, the Punisher must fight to save the lives of the children of the people he has fought against for five years, while at the same time fighting alongside the man who killed his family.

The Punisher (2004)

After an undercover operation where Bobby Saint, son of corrupt businessman Howard Saint (John Travolta), is killed, FBI agent, and former soldier, Frank Castle (Thomas Jane) retires. Howard Saint, holding Castle responsible for the death of his son, has his men murder Frank's family during a family reunion and leaves Frank for dead. Burned out and haunted by memories of his family, Frank sets out to avenge them and becomes a judge, jury and executioner known as "The Punisher", his trademark skull shirt being a final gift from Castle's son before his death. Castle sets out to punish Howard Saint and his associates in a one-man war, refusing to give up until those responsible are dead, including tricking Saint into killing his wife and head bodyguard by manipulating evidence to make him think that they are having an affair. An extended cut DVD was released on November 21, 2006, with 17 minutes of additional footage, most of which revolves around the character Jimmy Weeks (Russell Andrews), and Frank realizing that it was his friend that sold him out to Howard Saint. Features also include a black and white stop motion animated scene, set in Kuwait based on and partially done by artist Tim Bradstreet, and a Punisher comic book gallery. An extended version of "In Time" by Mark Collie also appears in the closing credits of the extended cut DVD.

Despite 2004's The Punisher being a box office disappointment, Lions Gate Entertainment was interested in a sequel based on the film's strong DVD sales. Jonathan Hensleigh and Thomas Jane were set to commence filming of the sequel, but the project remained in development hell for over 3 years due to the lack of a good script despite numerous writers being attached even after Hensleigh pulled out. Thomas Jane was so eager to do the sequel starring Jigsaw as the villain, that he'd put on an additional 12 pounds of muscle, and that "it would be darker, bloodier and more unfriendly than the first one." However, after reading the new script by Kurt Sutter, he stated, "What I won't do is spend months of my life sweating over a movie that I just don't believe in. I've always loved the Marvel guys and wish them well. Meanwhile, I'll continue to search for a film that one day might stand with all those films that the fans have asked me to watch."

Punisher: War Zone (2008)

Waging his one-man war on the world of organized crime, ruthless vigilante-hero Frank Castle (Ray Stevenson) sets his sights on overeager mob boss Billy "Jigsaw" Russoti (Dominic West). After Russoti is left horribly disfigured by Castle, he sets out for vengeance under his new alias: Jigsaw. With the "Punisher Task Force" hot on his trail, the FBI unable to take Jigsaw on, Frank must stand up to the formidable army that Jigsaw has recruited before more of his evil deeds go unpunished, while also attempting to atone for his unintentional killing of an undercover FBI agent during his assault on Russoti.

Ray Stevenson had expressed interest in sequels, hinting at Barracuda as a possible villain. At the 2008 San Diego Comic-Con, when asked if he signed on for more Punisher, he said, "If I had my wish, it's going to run and run. It's up to the fan base. If this works, we get to do it all again." After the first film was not received well by audiences, the rights for the character eventually reverted to Marvel.

Marvel Cinematic Universe

In February 2020, Adam Simon stated that he had previously pitched a The Punisher film to Marvel Studios that would be set in the Marvel Cinematic Universe (MCU), after the events of the Netflix television series of the same name, with Jon Bernthal reprising his role, described as "Falling Down by way of Full Metal Jacket":
"You got to let this thing live in R-Rated territory and it has to have the same grit and unapologetic boldness of Logan. In my take, we find Frank Castle as we left him at the end of the series, only now completely aware of the threat that superheroes and villains pose to mankind. So, Frank Castle has to go gunning for the person who he feels is responsible for the innumerable civilian casualties. The one who started it all by organizing these weapons of mass destruction to come together. Nick Fury. The twist is that Frank is being used, he spots the double-cross early at the end of act one. From that point on, we have a 3:10 to Yuma situation. Frank and Fury on the run from everyone, heroes and villains. It's 3:10 to Yuma meets L[é]on: The Professional by way of Winter Soldier."
In September 2014, Anthony and Joe Russo indicated that the Punisher had two cameo appearances in their feature film Captain America: The Winter Soldier (2014), as a Penske truck driver who runs over two different Hydra agents. The Russos also expressed interest in a Marvel One-Shot being produced about the character.

Animation

Iron Man: Rise of Technovore (2013)

The Punisher appears as a supporting character in the anime film Iron Man: Rise of Technovore (2013), voiced by Norman Reedus. He was first seen hunting down a member of A.I.M. selling weapons to a buyer. However, Iron Man saves the member and gets answers. After that, Iron Man and the Punisher work together discover Ezekiel Stane being responsible for framing Iron Man for a crime he didn't commit. Hawkeye and Black Widow were given the order to retrieve Iron Man, but the Punisher helps Iron Man escape to find Ezekiel Stane.

Avengers Confidential: Black Widow & Punisher (2014)

The Punisher appears as one of the main protagonists in the anime film Avengers Confidential: Black Widow & Punisher (2014), voiced by Brian Bloom. Punisher is taken into S.H.I.E.L.D. custody after interfering in a S.H.I.E.L.D. secret mission. In exchange for his release, the Punisher and the Black Widow are teamed up to take down the terrorist organization Leviathan who plans to auction stolen S.H.I.E.L.D. technology.

Fan films

The Punisher: Dirty Laundry (2012)

At the 2012 San Diego Comic-Con International, Jane debuted an independently financed Punisher short film, directed by Phil Joanou, written by Chad St. John, produced by Adi Shankar, and co-starring Ron Perlman, titled Dirty Laundry. Jane said, "I wanted to make a fan film for a character I've always loved and believed in – a love letter to Frank Castle & his fans. It was an incredible experience with everyone on the project throwing in their time just for the fun of it. It's been a blast to be a part of from start to finish — we hope the friends of Frank enjoy watching it as much as we did making it."

Do Not Fall in New York City (2012)

An animated Punisher fan film was also made in 2012 named Do Not Fall in New York City, with professional golfer Lee Westwood voicing the Punisher.

Skull (2020)
Stuntman Eric Linden, who worked on the MCU Netflix television series The Punisher as a stunt coordinator, second unit director and stunt double of Jon Bernthal, directed and played the lead role of the Punisher in the short film Skull, produced in association with FXitinPost.

Cast and crew

Principal cast
 This table only shows characters that have appeared in three or more films in the series.
 A dark grey cell indicates that the character was not in the film or that the character's presence in the film has yet to be announced.
 An  indicates an appearance through archival footage or stills.
 A  indicates a cameo role.
 An  indicates the actor was part of the main cast for the season.
 An  indicates a role as a stunt double.
 A  indicates an uncredited role.
 A  indicates a voice-only role.

Additional crew

Reception

Box office performance

Critical response

References

External links
The Punisher on Marvel.com

American crime drama films
Punisher films
Columbia Pictures franchises
Sony Pictures franchises
Lionsgate franchises